Lionel Simeon Marks (8 September 1871 – 6 January 1955) was a British engineer and one of the pioneers of aeronautics. He was born and mostly educated in England, but in 1892 moved to the United States. During World War II he was a chief consulting engineer to the US Bureau of Aircraft Production. His Marks' Standard Handbook for Mechanical Engineers is considered as classical reference work.

Biography

Marks was born in Birmingham, England, where he graduated from Mason Science College (which later became the University of Birmingham) in 1892 with a bachelor of science degree. He received a fellowship to study at the Cornell University, New York, United States. In 1894, he became professor of mechanical engineering at Harvard University and retired in 1940. In the early 1900s he was also professor at the Massachusetts Institute of Technology.

On 21 June 1906 he married Josephine Preston Peabody, an American poet and dramatist. They had a daughter, Alison Peabody Marks (30 July 1908 – 7 April 2008), and a son, Lionel Peabody Marks (10 February 1910 – 25 January 1984).

Marks died of a heart attack in Providence, Rhode Island, aged 83.

Publications
His most famous work is Marks' Standard Handbook for Mechanical Engineers, originally based on the German , was first published in 1916 as Mechanical Engineer's Handbook and contained 1836 pages. Its latest edition (11th, 2006) was compiled by 160 authors and comprised 1800 pages .

His other books include

References

External links
 

1871 births
1955 deaths
British mechanical engineers
Cornell University alumni
Alumni of University of London Worldwide
Alumni of the University of London
Alumni of the University of Birmingham
British emigrants to the United States
Harvard University faculty
Massachusetts Institute of Technology faculty